Peter McNamara (5 July 1955 – 20 July 2019) was an Australian tennis player and coach.

McNamara won five singles titles and nineteen doubles titles in his career. A right-hander, McNamara reached his highest singles ATP-ranking on 14 March 1983 when he became world No. 7. McNamara and fellow Australian Paul McNamee won the 1980 and 1982 men's doubles championship at Wimbledon and the Australian Open doubles in 1979. McNamara's highest rank in doubles was No. 3.

After retiring as a player, McNamara coached professionals including Mark Philippoussis, Grigor Dimitrov, Matthew Ebden and Wang Qiang.

McNamara died on 20 July 2019, at the age of 64, from prostate cancer.

Career finals

Singles (5 titles, 7 runner-ups)

Doubles (19 titles, 10 runner-ups)

References

External links
 
 
 
 

1955 births
2019 deaths
Australian male tennis players
Australian Open (tennis) champions
Australian tennis coaches
Deaths from prostate cancer
Deaths from cancer in Germany
Tennis players from Melbourne
Wimbledon champions
Grand Slam (tennis) champions in men's doubles
People educated at Marcellin College, Bulleen